Doliops curculionides is a species of beetle in the family Cerambycidae. It was described by Waterhouse in 1841.

References

 Contribution to the knowledge of the genus Doliops Waterhouse, 1841 (Coleoptera: Cerambycidae), ISSN 1407-8619

Doliops
Beetles described in 1841